Lake Hiawatha is located just north of Lake Nokomis in Minneapolis, Minnesota. It was purchased by the Minneapolis Park and Recreation Board in 1922 for $550,000. At that time the lake was a marsh known as Rice Lake, but over four years, the park system transformed the wetland into a lake surrounded by a park.

Features 
The lake and park have a fishing dock, wading pool, tennis courts, and softball diamonds. There is a recreation center that hosts activities. The lake borders a municipal golf course. In winter the golf course has groomed cross country ski trails and the park has ice and hockey rinks. A  shared-use path runs alongside the east side of the lake from East 43rd Street to Minnehaha Parkway where it connects to the Grand Rounds trail system and destinations such as Lake Nokomis, Minnehaha Creek, and Minnehaha Falls. Lake Hiawatha is one of the few lakes through which Minnehaha Creek flows, and the last one before it reaches Minnehaha Falls and then the Mississippi River.

Advocacy 
Friends of Lake Hiawatha is a community environmental action group that organizes volunteer efforts to clean the lake and park.

Hiawatha for All is an organization that advocates for the passage and effective implementation of the 9 Hole Plan. The 9 Hole Plan is the planning document created by the Park Board that will result in a restored wetland and flood resilient 9 hole golf course where the 18 hole golf course currently exists. https://hiawatha4all.com/

Fish
The lake contains black bullhead, black crappie, bluegill, bowfin, carp, golden shiner, green sunfish, hybrid sunfish, largemouth bass, northern pike, pumpkinseed, walleye, white sucker, yellow bullhead, and yellow perch. Some fish consumption guideline restrictions have been placed on the lake's bluegill and northern pike due to mercury and/or PCB contamination.

Water quality
Lake Hiawatha has much more garbage than any other Minneapolis lake. The lake is a stormwater outlet for the Corcoran, Central, Bryant, and Northrop neighborhoods, as well as the park's golf course. The Lake Hiawatha beach has been occasionally closed, such as in August 2014, because of unsafe levels of E. coli. Lake Hiawatha has been officially declared infested by zebra mussels since 2010, and in September 2013 park workers began finding mussels.

Golf Course 
The Rice Lake marsh was dredged to a depth of 33 feet, and the dredged soil was placed on the west side, to form the rolling landscape where the golf course was built.  The golf clubhouse was constructed in 1932, and the golf course was opened in July, 1934  (first 9 holes only, the full 18-hole course opened the next summer).  It was quickly heavily used by  Minneapolis residents. The dredged soil tended to compact and sink, requiring repairs to the early course, and a 1939 work relief project added shore retaining walls to prevent erosion, since the dredged shoreline was especially susceptible to erosion from waves.

The course was frequently used by metro-area African-American golfers, including several famous local figures like Solomon Hughes Sr. and Jimmy Slemmons.

Following a 2014 flood that caused extensive damage to the course, and the subsequent discovery of unpermitted groundwater pumping, the park board embarked on the development of a new master plan for the site. The planning process resulted in a recommendation to reduce the course from 18 holes to 9 holes, enhance the learning facilities for golf, use a greatly expanded wetland space to manage flooding and treat pollution, and introduce several new park amenities like boat rentals and concessions. The plan was met with resistance by golfers who wished to retain 18 holes. After several failed votes and years of debate, the plan passed on a 6-3 vote in September 2022.

See also
 List of lakes in Minneapolis
List of shared-use paths in Minneapolis

References

External links

Hiawatha
Parks in Minneapolis
Shared-use paths in Minneapolis